"Midnight at the Lost and Found" is a single by Meat Loaf released in 1983. It is from the album Midnight at the Lost and Found.

Track listing 
 "Midnight at the Lost and Found" (Remix)
 "Fallen Angel" (Remix)
 "Bat Out of Hell" (Live Version)
 "Dead Ringer for Love" (Long Version)

Charts

References

Meat Loaf songs
1983 singles